This page lists public opinion polls conducted for the 2015 French regional elections, which were held in two rounds on 6 and 13 December 2015.

Unless otherwise noted, all polls listed below are compliant with the regulations of the national polling commission (Commission nationale des sondages) and utilize the quota method.

National

First round

Second round 
Second round configurations were tested across all regions in France. In two regions, Nord-Pas-de-Calais-Picardie and Provence-Alpes-Côte d'Azur, the left-wing list withdrew after the first round to block the National Front from winning control.

Alsace-Champagne-Ardenne-Lorraine

First round

Second round 
After Jean-Pierre Masseret refused to withdraw his list in the second round, PS spokeswoman Corinne Narassiguin announced on 7 December that Masseret would "not have the socialist label" in the second round.

Aquitaine-Limousin-Poitou-Charentes

First round 
The October 2015 BVA poll described the list led by Olivier Dartigolles as one of the French Communist Party, and the June 2015 Ifop poll offered the options of an extreme left, Left Front, and National Front lists without naming a list leader, and also described Samuel Morillon as the list leader for Debout la France.

Second round

Auvergne-Rhône-Alpes

First round 
The January 2015 Ifop poll did not specify list leaders, only parties, and mentioned an "extreme-left" list without reference to Lutte Ouvrière.

Second round

Bourgogne-Franche-Comté

First round 
The June 2015 Ifop poll was conducted for Alain Joyandet and featured Joyandet leading a list for The Republicans (LR) separate from a Union of Democrats and Independents (UDI) list led by François Sauvadet without naming a Left Front list leader, whereas the June 2015 BVA poll was conducted for Sauvadet and featured a unified LR–UDI list.

Second round 
The November 2015 Ifop poll considered three scenarios: one in which the Democratic Movement (MoDem) did not secure enough support to be present in the second round, one in which it allied with the left, and one in which it allied with the right.

Brittany

First round 
The October 2015 BVA poll tested a Left Front list led jointly by Xavier Compain and Sylvie Larue.

Second round

Centre-Val de Loire

First round 
The September 2015 Ifop poll tested three scenarios: one in which Nicolas Sansu and Charles Fournier presented separate lists for the Left Front and Europe Ecology – The Greens, respectively, and two other scenarios in which Sansu and Fournier led a unified list. The May 2015 OpinionWay poll described Marc Brynhole as leader of the Left Front list, and considered separate lists for the Union of Democrats and Independents led by Philippe Vigier and for the Union for a Popular Movement (UMP), later The Republicans, led by Guillaume Peltier.

Second round 
The May 2015 OpinionWay poll tested Guillaume Peltier as the leader of the list of the right in the second round.

Corsica

First round

Île-de-France

First round 
The October 2015 BVA poll tested both a French Communist Party list led by Pierre Laurent and a Left Party list led by Éric Coquerel. The BVA poll conducted from 22 to 24 September 2015 was conducted for the Socialist Party (PS), while the BVA survey fielded between 1 and 3 September 2015 was commissioned by Europe Ecology – The Greens (EELV). The June 2015 Ifop poll tested a list led by Chantal Jouanno for the Union of Democrats and Independents (UDI) and specified an "extreme-left" list without naming a party or leader. The April 2015 Harris Interactive poll was conducted for the PS, and tested a joint Lutte Ouvrière and New Anticapitalist Party list led by Olivier Besancenot. The Ifop poll conducted from 31 March to 4 April 2015 tested two sets of scenarios: two with a divided right and centre, and the other two with the right and centre united behind Valérie Pécresse; it also tested only an "extreme-left" list without specifying a party or leader. The November 2014 Ifop poll did not specify "extreme-left", Left Front, or National Front list leaders, and proposed a joint list between the Democratic Movement (MoDem) and the UDI led by Jean-Christophe Lagarde as well as a unified list with Pécresse.

Second round

Languedoc-Roussillon-Midi-Pyrénées

First round 
The December and September 2015 OpinionWay polls were conducted for Europe Ecology – The Greens (EELV). The July 2015 PollingVox survey proposed a list of Europe Ecology – The Greens and the Left Party led by Gérard Onesta, a list of the Socialist Party and French Communist Party led by Carole Delga, a miscellaneous left list led by Philippe Saurel supported by the Radical Party of the Left, and a list led by Louis Aliot under the banner of the Rassemblement bleu Marine. The Ifop poll conducted from 30 June to 2 July 2015 proposed separate lists for the Left Front led by Guilhem Sérieys and for the EELV led by Onesta.

Second round

Nord-Pas-de-Calais-Picardie

First round 
The October 2015 Harris Interactive poll was conducted for the French Communist Party (PCF), and the October 2015 BVA poll did not specify a list leader for Nous Citoyens. The September 2015 Odoxa poll offered an "extreme-left" list without noting a party or leader, and in one scenario proposed a common list of the Left Front and Europe Ecology – The Greens (EELV) led by Fabien Roussel and Sandrine Rousseau. The September 2015 Ifop poll offered three scenarios: one in which the Left Front was divided between Roussel (supported by the PCF) and Rousseau (supported by EELV, the Left Party, and New Deal), one in which the parties of the Left Front united behind Roussel while Rousseau ran only an EELV list, and one in which the Left Front and EELV joined a single list conducted by Pierre de Saintignon of the Socialist Party (PS). The September 2015 Odoxa poll and June 2015 OpinionWay and Ifop polls each described separate Left Front and EELV lists; the first did not specify the party or leader of an "extreme-left" list, and also proposed a scenario with a united PS–EELV list led by Saintignon. The June 2015 Ifop poll, which was conducted for EELV, did not specify an "extreme-left" list leader or party, and neither did it specify a list leader for the Left Front when not in alliance, in which case Sandrine Rousseau conducted the list. It also tested two unified PS–EELV list scenarios: one in which the list was led by Saintignon, and the other by Rousseau.

Second round 
The November 2015 BVA poll tested two duels, the second of which specified a scenario in which the PS supported the list of the right.

Normandy

First round 
The February 2015 OpinionWay poll was commissioned by Debout la France, and did not specify a list leader for the Left Front or an "extreme-left" list (for which no party was specified).

Second round

Pays de la Loire

First round

Second round

Provence-Alpes-Côte d'Azur

First round 
The October 2015 BVA poll also named Jean-Marc Coppola as a list leader for the joint Europe Ecology – The Greens (EELV) and Left Front list alongside Sophie Camard, while the June 2015 proposed two separate lists, a Left Front list led by Coppola and an EELV list led by Camard, without naming list leaders for "extreme-left", Democratic Movement (MoDem), or Debout la France lists.

Second round

Guadeloupe

First round

French Guiana

First round

Réunion

First round 
Hugues Maillot was tested as list leader for Debout la France in the September 2015 Ipsos poll.

Second round

References

External links 
Notices of the French polling commission 

Opinion polling in France
France